Nocardioides baekrokdamisoli is a Gram-positive, non-spore-forming, short-rod-shaped and non-motile bacterium from the genus Nocardioides which has been isolated from sediments from Baekrodam lake, Korea.

References 

 

baekrokdamisoli
Bacteria described in 2016